Sir Stephen Finney CIE (8 September 1852 – 1 March 1924) was a rugby union international who represented England from 1872 to 1873.

Early life
Stephen Finney was born on 8 September 1852 in Marylebone. He was educated at Clifton College and the Royal Indian Engineering College, Cooper's Hill. As well as rugby, Finney also played cricket at Clifton and was said to have been one of the school's finest players.

Rugby union career
Finney played his rugby in the 1870s in a newly found club close to his working area Crewe Britannia which was short lived, closing in the 1880s. Currently in that area from 1922 is the present Crewe & Nantwich R.U.F.C. Before his days at Crewe Finney made his international debut on 5 February 1872 at The Oval in the England vs Scotland match. Of the two matches he played for his national side he was on the winning side on one occasions. He played his final match for England on 3 March 1873 at Hamilton Crescent, Glasgow in the Scotland vs England match. Of his prowess on the rugby field it was written after his death that "among those qualified to judge he is considered to have had no superior as a fearless and determined halfback".

Career
Finney entered the service of the Indian Public Works Department in 1874 and served as assistant and district engineer for four years. He then joined the administrative branch of the Railway Department and stayed there until 1891.

References

1852 births
1924 deaths
Alumni of the Royal Indian Engineering College
Companions of the Order of the Indian Empire
England international rugby union players
English rugby union players
People educated at Clifton College
RIE College RFC players
Rugby union halfbacks
Rugby union players from Marylebone